This is a listing/"catalogue raisonnė" of the works of the Maître de Guimiliau who was active between 1575 and 1589. He is best known for his work on the Calvary at Guimiliau. The Maître de Guimiliau's workshop included a second sculptor whose name is not recorded but who contributed to the Guimiliau calvary and worked on the arc de triomphe at Saint-Thégonnec. All the work was completed using kersanton stone.

Calvaries
Apart from the Guimiliau calvary, the Maître de Guimiliau worked on two other calvaries, those at Saint-Herbot and at Mespaul.

Other

Note
In his work on the Guimiliau calvary, the Maître de Guimiliau  was assisted by another sculptor who worked on five scenes; the annunciation, the visitation, the circumcision, the entry into Jerusalem and "Christ aux outrages". This sculptor is also credited with the pietà, three of the evangelists, Luke, Mark and Matthew as well as Saint Pol de Lėon. The identity of this sculptor is not known.

Further reading
"Sculpteurs sur pierre en Basse-Bretagne. Les Ateliers du XVe au XVIIe Siècle" by Emmanuelle LeSeac'h. Published by Presses Universitaires de Rennes.

References

Calvaries in Brittany
Buildings and structures in Finistère